The Canon EF-M 28mm f/3.5 Macro IS STM lens is an interchangeable Macro lens announced by Canon on May 11, 2016. The maximum magnification of this Macro lens is 1× in Normal mode and 1.2× in Super Macro mode. It is the first Canon lens with integrated macro light and uses the Hybrid IS.

Technical information 
The Canon EF-M 28mm f/3.5 Macro IS STM the first wide angle Macro lens in the Canon lineup. It has an integrated ring light, which is useful for macro photography. It can be use as ring light or as left / right light. The macro light is hidden if the lens hood is in place. The minimum focus distance is 97 mm and 93 mm at the super macro mode (1.2×).

References

https://www.usa.canon.com/internet/portal/us/home/products/details/lenses/ef/ef-m/ef-m-28mm-f-3-5-macro-is-stm

External links
 EF-M 28mm F3.5 Macro IS STML Review by Digital Photography Review

Canon EF-M-mount lenses
Macro lenses
Camera lenses introduced in 2016